Bromus lanceolatus, the Mediterranean brome, large-headed brome or lanceolate brome, is a species of flowering plant in the family Poaceae. It is native to the Mediterranean, the Middle East, the Caucasus, Central Asia, Xinjiang in China, Afghanistan and Pakistan. A tetraploid, it does well in disturbed habitats and has been introduced to scattered locations in North America, South America, and central Europe.

References

lanceolatus
Flora of Southwestern Europe
Flora of Southeastern Europe
Flora of North Africa
Flora of the Caucasus
Flora of Western Asia
Flora of the Gulf States
Flora of Central Asia
Flora of Pakistan
Flora of Xinjiang
Plants described in 1797